Kevin John Daly (born 5 June 1973) is a British-Irish economist. He is chair of the UK’s Society of Professional Economists (SPE). He is also co-head of CEEMEA Economics in Goldman Sachs, a member of the advisory panel  to the UK’s Office for Budget Responsibility and of a steering group of independent experts advising the UK Statistics Authority.

Early life
Daly was born in the United Kingdom in June 1973,  before moving to Ireland as a child. He obtained an MA in Economics from Gonville and Caius College, Cambridge, an MSc, with distinction, in Economics from University College London and a PhD in Economics from Trinity College Dublin, where his supervisor was Philip Lane.

Career
Daly was elected to the Council of the Society of Professional Economists in 2007 and became chair of the society in 2016, succeeding Dame Kate Barker in that role. During his time as chair, the Society changed its name (from the Society of Business Economists), expanded its activities into the area of professional development and saw a significant increase in its membership.

Daly joined Goldman Sachs in 2001 and was named managing director in 2010. In 2011, he became Goldman’s UK Chief Economist, succeeding Ben Broadbent in that role. In 2016, he was appointed co-head of Goldman’s CEEMEA economics team.

Other
Daly is a Fellow of the Academy of Social Sciences.

He won the SPE’s Rybczynski Essay Prize, established in memory of the economist and former chair of the society Tadeusz Rybczynski, in 2004 and 2007.

He has appeared as an expert witness before the House of Commons Treasury Select Committee and the House of Lords European Union Committee.

Daly was previously a winner for the Economic Research Council’s ‘Clash of the Titans’ forecasting competition, defeating Stephen King and Baroness Ros Altmann.

References

1973 births
Living people
British economists
Alumni of Gonville and Caius College, Cambridge
Alumni of University College London
Alumni of Trinity College Dublin
Fellows of the Academy of Social Sciences